Tietjen is a German surname. Notable people with the surname include:

Bettina Tietjen (born 1960), German television presenter
Friedrich Tietjen (1834–1895), German astronomer
Heinz Tietjen (1881–1967), German conductor
Henry Roland Tietjen (1891-1976), American Legislator (Utah)
James J. Tietjen (1933–2016), American researcher and executive
John Tietjen (1928–2004), American Lutheran clergyman, theologian

Other uses
2158 Tietjen, main-belt asteroid
Wilhelm-Tietjen-Stiftung für Fertilisation, fertility research group

See also
Tietjens

German-language surnames